Ashley T. Cole Handicap is an American thoroughbred horse race run annually at Belmont Park in Elmont, New York. Run in mid September, the race is open to horses age three and older bred in the State of New York. Currently offering a purse of US$125,000, it is contested on turf at a distance of  miles. Prior to 1989, it was run on dirt. Due to weather conditions, the 2001 edition was raced on dirt.

The race is named for the late Ashley T. Cole, a chairman of the New York State Racing Commission who played a crucial role in the creation of the New York Racing Association.

Inaugurated in 1976 at Aqueduct Racetrack in Queens, New York, until 1983 it was restricted to two-year-old horses. Since 1992 the race has been hosted by Belmont Park.

Records
Speed record: (at current distance of  miles)
 1:46.43 – Provincetown (2004)

Most wins:

 2 – Lubash (2012, 2014)
 2 – Kate's Valentine (1990, 1991)

Most wins by an owner:
 2 – James F. Edwards (1990, 1991)
 2 – Earle I. Mack (1979, 2000)
 2 – Anstu Stable (2000, 2002)

Most wins by a jockey:
 3 – Jerry Bailey (1992, 1998, 2002)

Most wins by a trainer:
 2 – Sarah A. Lundy (1990, 1991)
 2 – Gary Sciacca (1986, 2000)
 2 – John O. Hertler (1999, 2006)

Winners

References

Horse races in New York (state)
Turf races in the United States
Recurring sporting events established in 1976
Belmont Park
1976 establishments in New York (state)